Epermenia maculata is a moth in the family Epermeniidae. It was described by Reinhard Gaedike in 2004. It is found on Madagascar.

References

Epermeniidae
Moths described in 2004
Moths of Madagascar